Yechiel Michel Pines (18 September 1824 – 15 March 1913) was a Russian-born religious Zionist rabbi, writer, and community leader in the Old Yishuv.

Yechiel Michel Pines was born at Ruzhinoy, near Grodno. He was the son of Noah Pines and the son-in-law of Shemariah Luria, rabbi of Mogilev. He received both a religious and secular Jewish education, and was mentored by Rabbi Mordechai Gimpel Jaffe, an early leader of Ḥovevei Zion.

He later became a merchant, giving lectures at the same time in the yeshiva of his native town. He was elected delegate to a conference held in London by the association Mazkereth Moshe, for the establishment of charitable institutions in Palestine in commemoration of the name of Sir Moses Montefiore. In 1878 he settled in Jerusalem, at the home of his relative Yosef Rivlin, to establish and organize such institutions.

At the end of his life, Pines was an instructor in Talmud at the Hebrew Teachers' Seminary in Jerusalem.

Legacy

There is a street named after Pines near Davidka Square in Jerusalem, as well as streets in Rehovot,  Ra'anana and Petah Tikvah. The Israeli religious moshav Kfar Pines is named after him.

References

1824 births
1913 deaths
19th-century rabbis from the Russian Empire
Emigrants from the Russian Empire to the Ottoman Empire
19th-century rabbis in Jerusalem
Ashkenazi rabbis in Ottoman Palestine
Religious Zionist Orthodox rabbis
People from Pruzhany District